Marcial Alberto Garay (born 29 April 1968) is a Paraguayan former footballer who played as a forward. He made three appearances for the Paraguay national team from 1993 to 1995. He was also part of Paraguay's squad for the 1993 Copa América tournament.

References

External links
 
 

1968 births
Living people
Paraguayan footballers
Association football forwards
Paraguay international footballers
Sportivo Luqueño players
Atlético Morelia players
Unión Magdalena footballers
Club Olimpia footballers
12 de Octubre Football Club players
Deportivo Recoleta footballers
Club Sol de América footballers
Club Guaraní players
Paraguayan expatriate footballers
Paraguayan expatriate sportspeople in Mexico
Expatriate footballers in Mexico
Paraguayan expatriate sportspeople in Colombia
Expatriate footballers in Colombia
People from Encarnación, Paraguay